Funkatron is the debut studio album of Cult of Jester, released in 1998 by Flaming Fish. The song "John Carpenter", which originally appeared on the Awaiting the Dawn various artists compilation, was released on the 2017 digital remaster.

Reception
The Phantom Tollbooth commended the Funkatrons humor but criticized the lyrics for being "anti-Christian", calling it an "impressive yet uninspiring hour's worth of music that will either offend, intrigue, or amuse you." Despite this, the critic said "I found the album to be well layered with a solid mix, and a great effort all the way musically" and "every song has a killer groove or loop in there somewhere, and when it hits, it hits hard"

Track listingNotes Tracks 11–15 consist of four seconds of silence each

Personnel
Adapted from the Funkatron liner notes.Cult of Jester Ed Finkler – vocals, instruments, productionProduction and design'
 Carson Pierce – executive-producer

Release history

References

External links 
 
 
  Funkatron at Bandcamp
 Funkatron at iTunes

1998 debut albums
Cult of Jester albums